Jari Sara (born 25 April 1989) is a Finnish footballer, who plays as a defender for FF Jaro in Veikkausliiga. He was born in Pattijoki.

References 

1989 births
Living people
Finnish footballers
Veikkausliiga players
FF Jaro players
Association football defenders
Jakobstads BK players